Silent Hour/Golden Mile is the debut solo EP by American musician Daniel Rossen, released on March 20, 2012 by Warp Records. The self-produced EP comprises tracks Rossen had initially written for Grizzly Bear's fourth studio album, Shields (2012).

Background and recording
After extensive touring in support of Grizzly Bear's third studio album, Veckatimest (2009), the band undertook a six-month hiatus, with Daniel Rossen writing new material during the break. 

Rossen ultimately decided to release a solo EP; a decision informed by the band's increasing collaborative nature. Rossen noted, "Recently the way it’s been feeling is that if I finish a song and the full form is there – the lyrics and an arrangement I’ve already decided on – that pretty much automatically means it’s something I should work on alone. It doesn’t really work well to force parts onto Grizzly Bear. [...] Grizzly Bear has become very collaborative, very collective. That’s kind of why [the] EP happened."

The majority of the EP was recorded in New York City, with Rossen stating, "I didn’t fully move out of the city but I was spending the majority of my time in upstate New York, a lot of it in the winter. I recorded a lot of [Silent Hour/Golden Mile] in that space of time out there."

Track listing

Personnel

Musicians
Daniel Rossen - vocals, guitar, bass guitar, piano, keyboards, cello, drums, percussion
Scott Hirsch - lap steel guitar (1 and 3)
Eric Slick - drums (5)
Frank Cohen - trombone (3 and 4)
Nick Tucker - bassoon (3 and 4)
Ben Brody - french horn (3 and 4)
Zubin Hensler - trumpet (3 and 4)
Ian Davis - horn arrangements (3)
Kris Nolte - horn arrangements (4)

Recording personnel
Daniel Rossen - producer, recording
Jon Low - recording engineer (5)
Nicolas Vernhes - mixing
Greg Calbi - mastering

Artwork
Amelia Bauer - artwork

References

2012 EPs
Warp (record label) EPs